is a Japanese professional footballer who plays as a forward or attacking midfielder for Belgian club Sint-Truiden.

Internationally, he is currently the top active Japan national team goalscorer and third all-time in team history with 50 goals. He also won the Premier League with Leicester City in 2016.

Club career

Shimizu S-Pulse
After graduating Takigawa Daini High School in 2004, Okazaki signed full professional terms with Shimizu S-Pulse the following year. In December 2005, he made his first J.League appearance as a substitute against Sanfrecce Hiroshima. On 15 April 2007, he scored his first professional goal against Kawasaki Frontale. Okazaki ended his first season as a first team player with three goals from 13 matches.

Okazaki scored ten times in 27 matches during the 2008 J. League season and also represented S-Pulse in the J. League Cup Final, where the team lost 2–0 to Oita Trinita. He continued his promising goalscoring in the 2009 and 2010 seasons and, in January 2011, was signed by German side VfB Stuttgart of the Bundesliga.

VfB Stuttgart

On 30 January 2011, Okazaki signed a three-and-a-half-year contract with Stuttgart. On 17 February 2011, clearance to play for the club was granted for Okazaki by FIFA. He made his competitive debut for VfB on the same night in a Europa League match against Benfica. On 20 February 2011, Okazaki made his Bundesliga debut for VfB against Bayer 04 Leverkusen. Okazaki scored his first goal against Hannover 96, which he scored from outside the box.

Okazaki came on as a second-half substitute for Stuttgart in their first game of the 2011–12 Bundesliga season against FC Schalke 04. His side were up 2–0 and Okazaki added a goal scoring from long range in the 90th minute, sealing a 3–0 win. Okazaki's goal from a bicycle kick on 19 February 2012 in a Bundesliga match of VfB Stuttgart against Hannover 96 was selected Goal of the Month. After Yasuhiko Okudera in April 1978, Okazaki was the second player from Japan to win this award in Germany.

Okazaki had a poor 2012–13 season, scoring only once in the Bundesliga. However, he scored his first goals in European competition with two goals against FC Steaua București in the Europa League.

Mainz 05
On 1 July 2013, Okazaki moved to 1. FSV Mainz 05. He scored his first goal for Mainz on his debut in a 3–2 win against his former club Stuttgart on the opening matchday of the 2013–14 Bundesliga season. At the end of the season he ended with 15 league goals.

Okazaki became the most prolific Japanese player in Bundesliga history on 13 September 2014, scoring his 27th and 28th league goals in Mainz's 3–1 win over Hertha Berlin.

Leicester City

2015–16

On 26 June 2015, Okazaki moved to Premier League side Leicester City for a fee believed to be in the region of £7 million, subject to obtaining a work permit. He made his debut for the club on 8 August 2015 in Leicester City's 4–2 opening day win against Sunderland, and scored his first goal for the club the following week in a 2–1 win against West Ham United. On 19 December 2015, Okazaki scored the winner in a 3–2 win over Everton at Goodison Park, to ensure that Leicester City topped the table at Christmas. On 10 January 2016, Okazaki scored Leicester's second goal in the FA Cup clash at White Hart Lane with Tottenham Hotspur despite drawing to a Harry Kane penalty in the 90th minute. On 14 March 2016, Okazaki scored in a league fixture against Newcastle United: a spectacular overhead strike that won Leicester City the game 1–0 and took them five points clear at the top of the Premier League table. Okazaki went on to win the league that year,  thus becoming the second Japanese player to win the Premier League after Shinji Kagawa.

His performances in the 2015–16 season earned him the Asian International Player of the Year award in December 2016.

2016–17
Okazaki scored twice in a 2–4 defeat to Chelsea in the third round of the 2016–17 EFL Cup on 20 September 2016. He scored his first league goal of the season in a 3–1 win over Crystal Palace on 22 October 2016, earning him Man of the match and achieving an 84.8% pass success rate, more than any other Leicester player. On 22 November 2016, Okazaki scored in a 2–1 win over Club Brugge in the Champions League group stage, becoming the sixth Japanese player to score a Champions League goal and the first since Keisuke Honda in November 2013. He finished the season with only three league goals.

2017–2019
Okazaki was in goalscoring form at the start to the 2017–18 season, scoring four goals in six appearances for Leicester in all competitions. He was released by Leicester at the end of the 2018–19 season.

Málaga
On 30 July 2019, Okazaki signed a one-year contract with Málaga CF. However, Málaga canceled its contract with Okazaki after just 34 days, since his wage demands exceeded its maximum budget as permitted by the league.

Huesca
On 4 September 2019, the free agent Okazaki signed a one-year contract with Segunda División side Huesca. On 8 September 2019, he made his debut for Huesca as a substitute.

On 25 July 2020, after scoring 12 times as his side achieved promotion to La Liga, Okazaki renewed his contract for a further year.

Cartagena
On 31 August 2021, Okazaki moved to FC Cartagena in the second division on a one-year contract.

Sint-Truiden
On 19 August 2022, Okazaki signed with Sint-Truiden in Belgium.

International career

After competing for the country's under-23 team at the 2008 Olympic Games in China, Okazaki made his full international debut for Japan against the United Arab Emirates in October 2008. On 20 January 2009, he scored his first goal for Samurai Blue in the team's opening 2011 AFC Asian Cup qualifier against Yemen.

In October 2009, Okazaki scored hat-tricks in consecutive matches as Japan beat Hong Kong and Togo 6–0 and 5–0 respectively. He was named The World's Top Goal Scorer of 2009 by the IFFHS for his 15 goals with the national team.
Okazaki was included in the 2010 FIFA World Cup squads for the 2010 FIFA World Cup and appeared as a substitute in all four of the Japan's matches. He scored once in the final Group E match, a 3–1 defeat of Denmark, to send Japan into the second round.

On 8 October 2010, Okazaki scored as Japan beat Argentina 1–0 in friendly match to record its first ever win over the 1978 and 1986 world champions.

Okazaki scored his third international hat-trick in a 5–0 Group B win against Saudi Arabia at the 2011 AFC Asian Cup. He then scored his kick in the semi-final shootout win over South Korea and played all 120 minutes of the final as Japan beat Australia to win the trophy for a fourth time.

Okazaki finished as top goalscorer in the Asian section of qualification for the 2014 FIFA World Cup with eight goals.

Okazaki scored twice at the 2013 FIFA Confederations Cup, against Italy and Mexico respectively. However, Japan lost all three of its matches and was eliminated at the end of the group stage.

In June 2014, Okazaki was selected in the Japan national football team for the 2014 FIFA World Cup. In the team's third group match, a 4–1 defeat to Colombia, he scored Samurai Blue's only goal with a header in the 45th minute.

Okazaki was included in Japan national football team for the 2015 AFC Asian Cup and scored in a 4–0 defeat of Palestine during the group stage.

In March 2016 Okazaki was presented with a commemorative shirt with 100 on the back in a presentation to celebrate his 100th international appearance for Japan.

Okazaki is currently the top active Japan national team goalscorer and third all-time in team history with 50 international goals.

Career statistics

Club

1Includes Emperor's Cup, DFB-Pokal, FA Cup, Community Shield and Copa del Rey.
2Includes J.League Cup and EFL Cup.
3Includes UEFA Europa League and UEFA Champions League.

International

Scores and results list Japan's goal tally first, score column indicates score after each Okazaki goal.

Honours
Leicester City
Premier League: 2015–16

SD Huesca
Segunda División: 2019–20

Japan
AFC Asian Cup: 2011
Kirin Cup: 2009, 2011

Individual
J.League Best XI: 2009
IFFHS World's Top Goal Scorer: 2009
AFC International Footballer of the Year: 2016
Best Footballer in Asia: 2016

See also
List of men's footballers with 100 or more international caps
List of men's footballers with 50 or more international goals

References

External links

1986 births
Living people
People from Takarazuka, Hyōgo
Association football people from Hyōgo Prefecture
Japanese footballers
Association football forwards
Shimizu S-Pulse players
VfB Stuttgart players
1. FSV Mainz 05 players
Leicester City F.C. players
Málaga CF players
SD Huesca footballers
FC Cartagena footballers
Sint-Truidense V.V. players
J1 League players
Bundesliga players
Premier League players
La Liga players
Segunda División players
Best Footballer in Asia
Olympic footballers of Japan
Japan international footballers
Footballers at the 2008 Summer Olympics
2010 FIFA World Cup players
2011 AFC Asian Cup players
2013 FIFA Confederations Cup players
2014 FIFA World Cup players
2015 AFC Asian Cup players
2018 FIFA World Cup players
2019 Copa América players
AFC Asian Cup-winning players
FIFA Century Club
Japanese expatriate footballers
Japanese expatriate sportspeople in Germany
Japanese expatriate sportspeople in England
Japanese expatriate sportspeople in Spain
Japanese expatriate sportspeople in Belgium
Expatriate footballers in Germany
Expatriate footballers in England
Expatriate footballers in Spain
Expatriate footballers in Belgium